Elvia Violeta Menjívar Escalante (born 1952 in Arcatao) is a Salvadoran politician affiliated with the Farabundo Martí National Liberation Front. She has been Minister of Health and Social Welfare since 1 June 2014. She is the former mayor of San Salvador.

Born Elvia Violeta Menjívar in Arcatao, Chalatenango, she studied medicine at the University of El Salvador. In 1979 she became a member of the Fuerzas Populares de Liberación "Farabundo Martí" or FPL, one of five leftist organizations that united to form the current Farabundo Martí National Liberation Front (generally known by its Spanish-language acronym FMLN). During the civil war she provided medical aid to combatants and civilians in the Chalatenango Department.

In 1992 she was elected deputy to the Legislative Assembly of El Salvador, representing the FMLN, a position for which she was re-elected in 2000 and 2003.  She was designated by her party as the candidate for the Mayor of San Salvador elections in 2005, defeating the conservative candidate of ARENA, Rodrigo Samayoa. She is the first woman to serve as mayor of San Salvador. She lost in the election of January 18, 2009 to Norman Quijano of the ARENA party.

External links
Alcaldesa de San Salvador (in Spanish)

1952 births
Living people
People from Chalatenango Department
Farabundo Martí National Liberation Front politicians
Government ministers of El Salvador
Health ministers of El Salvador
Women government ministers of El Salvador
Members of the Legislative Assembly of El Salvador
Mayors of San Salvador
Women mayors of places in El Salvador
Salvadoran physicians
University of El Salvador alumni
People of the Salvadoran Civil War
20th-century Salvadoran women politicians
20th-century Salvadoran politicians
21st-century Salvadoran women politicians
21st-century Salvadoran politicians
20th-century women physicians